Metarctia upembae is a moth of the subfamily Arctiinae. It was described by Sergius G. Kiriakoff in 1949. It is found in the Democratic Republic of the Congo and Tanzania.

References

 

Metarctia
Moths described in 1949